The 1917 USC Trojans football team represented the University of Southern California (USC) in the 1917 college football season. In their fourth year under head coach Dean Cromwell, the Trojans compiled a 4–2–1 record  and outscored their opponents by a combined total of 127 to 47.

Schedule

References

USC Trojans
USC Trojans football seasons
USC Trojans football